Chom Thong is a khwaeng (subdistrict) of Chom Thong district, in Bangkok, Thailand. In 2020, it had a total population of 33,232 people.

References

Subdistricts of Bangkok
Chom Thong district, Bangkok